The Mt. Lebanon Tunnel is a light rail tunnel in Allegheny County, Pennsylvania, also known as the Dormont/Mt. Lebanon Transit Tunnel, part of the Pittsburgh Light Rail system.

The pre-tunnel trolley street line, which ended in 1984, ran from the long-removed Clearview Loop stop on Alfred St. (Mt. Lebanon) to the intersection of McFarland Rd. and Raleigh Ave. (Dormont).

The tunnel was constructed by a technique called the New Austrian Tunnelling method, a tunneling process developed in the early 1960s that has become the primary tunneling practice in Europe. This is the first time that this money-saving technique was used for transit construction in the United States.

The difference with NATM lies in the means of support required to maintain the rock cavity and the configuration of the tunnel structure. With conventional tunneling, support of the rock cavity consists of a rib cage framework of steel beams and horizontal wooden planks. A reinforced steel concrete lining is added to create a perfectly shaped tunnel. With NATM, the rock surrounding the hole becomes the support system. This is done by lining the tunnel cavity with several thin layers of shotcrete, concrete that is blown on under air pressure.

The tunnel has continuous television surveillance.

References

External links

 - Southern portal
 - Northern portal

Tunnels in Allegheny County, Pennsylvania
5 ft 2½ in gauge railways in the United States
Railroad tunnels in Pennsylvania